Ariel Vromen (born February 14, 1973) is an Israeli film director and screenwriter best known for directing the 2012 American film The Iceman.

Life and career
Vromen grew up in the Ramat Aviv neighbourhood of Tel Aviv, Israel, to a family of Jewish descent. When he was 12, his parents bought him an 8mm camera. As a teenager, he used to shoot short films with his friends and later edit them. In an interview to Haaretz he said, "It was my obsession, I shot more than 40 short films - about cops, criminals and even an alien who comes to earth and kills all men". Vromen spent his Israel Defense Forces military service at the Airborne Rescue And Evacuation Unit 669. After his service, he studied law at the University of Kent in England. During his stay in Europe, he was a D.J. and later became a trance D.J. He attended a film school in New York at the age of 28.

In 2001, he wrote and directed the short film Jewel of the Sahara starring Gerard Butler. The film received positive reviews and was screened at a number of festivals. While making this film, an intern coming from a wealthy family accompanied Vromen to learn from him and at the end of his work on the film Vromen got a 900,000-dollar  check from the intern who told him "here is the money for your first feature film". This funding helped him make the thriller Rx. Right after his work on Rx he got an offer to direct a film called Danika.

In 2005, after watching a documentary film on HBO about the serial killer Richard Kuklinski who worked for the mafia and murdered more than 125 people from the 1960s to the 1980s, Vromen began work on The Iceman. Vromen and his co-writer, Morgan Land, read more than 1,000 pages of Kuklinski's criminal records. In August 2012, The Iceman was screened at the 69th Venice International Film Festival and was released worldwide in May 2013.

Filmography as director
 Jewel of the Sahara (2001) - short film
 Rx (2005)
 Danika (2006)
 The Iceman (2012)
 Criminal (2016)
 Skeptical (2011) - documentary film
 The Angel (2018)

References

External links

The Scorecard Review interview
Times of Israel article

1973 births
Israeli film directors
Israeli male screenwriters
Israeli emigrants to the United States
Living people
Alumni of the University of Kent